Jean-Luc Joinel (born September 21, 1953, in Saint-Vincent-de-Cosse) is a retired French international rugby union player. He played as a Flanker for CA Brive.
He earned his first cap with the French national team on 11 November 1977 against New Zealand at Toulouse.

Honours 
 Selected to represent France, 1976–1983
 Five Nations Championship: 1983 and 1986
 Grand Slam :  1981
 Mediterranean Games 1979, 1983

External links
 Jean-Luc Joinel International Statistics

1953 births
French rugby union players
Living people
France international rugby union players
Rugby union flankers
Competitors at the 1979 Mediterranean Games
Competitors at the 1983 Mediterranean Games
Mediterranean Games competitors for France
Sportspeople from Dordogne
CA Brive players